Dragoș Nicolae Mădăraș (born 12 September 1997) is a Romanian-born Swedish tennis player.

Mădăraș has a career high ATP singles ranking of 289 achieved on 3 October 2022. His career high ATP doubles ranking of 554 was achieved on 9 May 2022.

Career

2022: ATP debut

He made his ATP debut at the 2022 Sofia Open as a qualifier where he lost to Oscar Otte in the first round.

National representation

Davis Cup
Mădăraș represents Sweden at the Davis Cup, where he made his first appearance in March 2022 in a tie against Japan.

Challenger and Futures/World Tennis Tour Finals

Singles: 18 (13-5)

References

External links

1997 births
Living people
Swedish male tennis players
Romanian male tennis players
People from Deva, Romania
Swedish people of Romanian descent
Romanian emigrants to Sweden
Naturalized citizens of Sweden